In physical geography, a dell is a small secluded hollow, (implying also) grassy, park-like, usually partially-wooded valley. The word "dell" comes from the Old English word dell, which is related to the Old English word dæl, modern 'dale'. Dells in literature are often portrayed as pleasant safe havens. The term is sometimes used interchangeably with dingle, although this specifically refers to deep ravines or hollows that are embowered with trees. The terms have also been combined to form examples of tautological placenames in Dingle Dell, Kent, and Dingle Dell Reserve, Auckland.

See also
 
 
 
 
 
 
 
 
  - Tolkien's fictional Elvish locale.

References

External links

Slope landforms
Geography terminology
Valleys